Ab Koreh Tal (also Romanized as Āb Koreh Tal) is a village in Rak Rural District, in the Central District of Kohgiluyeh County, Kohgiluyeh and Boyer-Ahmad Province, Iran. At the 2006 census, its population was 39, in 7 families.

References 

Populated places in Kohgiluyeh County